Meaul is a hill in the Rhinns of Kells, a sub-range of the Galloway Hills range, part of the Southern Uplands of Scotland. It is climbed from a number of directions; most commonly from Garryhorn near Carsphairn, often as part of a complete traverse of the ridge.

Subsidiary SMC Summits

References

Donald mountains
Mountains and hills of the Southern Uplands
Mountains and hills of Dumfries and Galloway